Year 383 (CCCLXXXIII) was a common year starting on Sunday (link will display the full calendar) of the Julian calendar. At the time, it was known as the Year of the Consulship of Merobaudes and Saturninus (or, less frequently, year 1136 Ab urbe condita). The denomination 383 for this year has been used since the early medieval period, when the Anno Domini calendar era became the prevalent method in Europe for naming years.

Events 
 By place 

 Britannia 
 Niall of the Nine Hostages becomes the first High King of Ireland.
 Hadrian's Wall, the northern Roman frontier in Britain, is overrun by the Picts and falls into ruin.
The Romans leave the region of Wales.

 Roman Empire 
 January 19 – Arcadius is elevated to Emperor.
 Roman troops in Britain proclaim Magnus Maximus Emperor. He crosses over to the continent and makes Trier his capital. Gaul, the Italian provinces and Hispania proclaim loyalty to him.
 August 25 – Emperor Gratian, age 24, is assassinated at Lugdunum (modern-day Lyon), leaving a young widow Laeta. Pannonia and Africa maintain their allegiance to co-emperor Valentinian II, now 12, whose mother, Justina, rules in his name.
 Emperor Theodosius I cedes Dacia and Macedonia to Valentinian II. They recognize Magnus Maximus as Augustus.
 Theodosius I sends Flavius Stilicho as an envoy to the Persian court of King Shapur III at Ctesiphon, to negotiate a peace settlement relating to the partition of Armenia.

 Asia 
 Battle of Feishui: The Jin Dynasty defeats the Former Qin dynasty in Anhui.
 King Ardashir II dies after a 4-year reign. He is succeeded by his son Shapur III.

 By topic 

 Religion 
 First Council of Constantinople (some authorities date this council to 381): Theodosius I calls a general council to affirm and extend the Nicene Creed, and denounce Arianism and Apollinarism. Most trinitarian Christian churches consider this an Ecumenical council.
 By the order of Theodosius I, Eunomius of Cyzicus is banished to Moesia.

Births 
 Lupus of Troyes, French bishop and saint (approximate date)

Deaths 
 May 30 – Isaac of Dalmatia, Byzantine Orthodox priest and saint
 August 25 – Gratian, Roman Emperor (assassinated) (b. 359)
 October 21 – Ursula, Roman Christian martyr and saint
 Ardashir II, Sassanid king (shah) ("King of Kings")
 Flavia Maxima Constantia, daughter of Constantius II
 Frumentius, Phoenician missionary and bishop
 Fu Rong, Chinese general and prime minister
 Ulfilas (or Wulfila), Gothic missionary and bishop

References 

383